Lars K. Aaker (September 19, 1825 – August 14, 1895) was an American farmer and politician who served in both chambers of the Minnesota Legislature.

Early life 
Born in Lårdal, Telemark, Norway, Aaker emigrated to the United States in 1845 and lived in Dane County, Wisconsin Territory. In 1847, Aaker moved to Goodhue County, Minnesota Territory and then to Alexandria, Minnesota in 1870.

Career 
Aaker was a farmer and in the mercantile business. During the American Civil War, Aaker served in the 3rd Minnesota Volunteer Infantry Regiment. In 1859–1860, 1862, 1867, and 1869, Aaker served in the Minnesota House of Representatives and as a Republican. In 1881 and 1882, Aaker served in Minnesota Senate.

He worked in the General Land Office in Alexandria, Minnesota from 1870 to 1876 and then in Crookston, Minnesota from 1883 to 1893.

Death 
Aaker died from a stroke at his home in Alexandria, Minnesota.

Notes

Related reading
Lovoll, Odd S. (2007) Norwegians on the Prairie: Ethnicity and the Development of the Country Town  (Minnesota Historical Society) 

1825 births
1895 deaths
Norwegian emigrants to the United States
People from Dane County, Wisconsin
People from Alexandria, Minnesota
People from Telemark
People of Minnesota in the American Civil War
Union Army officers
Businesspeople from Minnesota
Farmers from Minnesota
Republican Party Minnesota state senators
Republican Party members of the Minnesota House of Representatives
People from Goodhue County, Minnesota
People from Crookston, Minnesota
19th-century American politicians
Military personnel from Wisconsin